Ochina, commonly known as the ivy-boring beetles, is a genus of beetle of the family Ptinidae.

Subgenus and species
Ochina (Cittobium)
Ochina ferruginea
Ochina hirsuta
Ochina leveillei
Ochina ptinoides
Ochina (Ochina)
Ochina latrellii

Distribution
Species of this genus are native to Europe, the Near East, and North Africa.

References

Ptinidae